This is a list of Melges 32 sailboat championships.

World Championships

References

Melges 32